Marian Petreanu (born 8 September 1950) is a Romanian former football midfielder.

International career
Petreanu played one game at international level for Romania on 30 January 1972, when coach Gheorghe Ola used him in order to replace Constantin Radu in the 46th minute of a friendly match which ended with a 4–2 victory against Morocco.

Honours
Rapid București
Cupa României: 1971–72

References

External links
Marian Petreanu at Labtof.ro

1950 births
Living people
Romanian footballers
Romania international footballers
Association football midfielders
Liga I players
FC Rapid București players
FC Sportul Studențesc București players
FC Gloria Buzău players